Mysen is the administrative center of the municipality of Eidsberg in the county of Østfold in Norway.

The town is named after the old farm of Mysen (Norse Mysin, from *Mosvin), since the town is built on its ground. The first element is mosi m 'bog, marsh', the last element is  vin  m 'meadow, pasture'.

The town's history

Between 1920 and 1961, it was a separate municipality. Mysen became an independent municipality on 1 July 1920 when it was spun off from Eidsberg. On 1  January 1961 Mysen was  merged again with Eidsberg. As with many other places in Eastern Norway Mysen has grown up around a railway station, after Østfold Line's Eastern Line opened in 1882. Today the station is an end stop for most local trains on the eastern line. Therefore, Mysen is a communication center for inner Østfold, with bus routes to most of the surrounding area, also Töcksfors in Sweden. The village had 6,084 inhabitants as of 1 January 2011.

During the Second World War. there was a Nazi concentration camp at Mysen.  One camp commandant was Hans Aumeier, who was later tried and convicted at the Auschwitz Trial.

Notable people from Mysen 

 Jan Garbarek, musician
 Atle Næss, author
 Eva Røine, psychologist and author
 Brage Vastevik, gravity mountain biker

See also
Momarken, a racecourse just north of Mysen

References

External links

Former municipalities of Norway
Cities and towns in Norway
Populated places in Østfold
Eidsberg